Ylva Lööf (born 28 February 1958) is a Swedish actress who has appeared in a number of films and television shows.

Filmography
1989–1991 – Tre kärlekar (English title Three Loves) (TV)
1992 – En komikers uppväxt (TV)
1994 – Min vän Percys magiska gymnastikskor (TV)
1997 – Rederiet (English title High Seas or The Shipping Company) (TV)
1998 – Skärgårdsdoktorn (TV)
1999 – Dödsklockan (TV)
Hälsoresan - En smal film av stor vikt (1999)
2001 - Återkomsten (TV)
Så som i himmelen (2004)
Münsters fall (2005)
Beck – Skarpt läge (2006)

External links

References

Living people
Swedish actresses
1958 births